Vince (22 September 2012 – 5 March 2017) was a Southern white rhinoceros who was killed by poachers inside a zoo in Thoiry near Paris, France.

Birth and life
Vince was born on 22 September 2012 at Royal Burgers' Zoo, Arnhem, Netherlands. He was the second calf produced by 12-year-old Kwanzaa and her 20-year-old mate Gilou. Vince was born six weeks premature. On 6 November 2012 he was introduced to other safari animals at the Zoo.

In March 2015, Vince and another rhinoceros Bruno were transferred to Parc Zoologique de Thoiry in France. He lived in an enclosure with two other rhinoceroses, Bruno and Gracie. The three animals bonded, and Vince and Bruno, who were the same age, often played together.

Killing
On 5 March 2017, Vince was shot three times and killed by a group of poachers. They removed one of Vince’s horns by using a chainsaw, and partially sawed off his second horn. It is believed that this attack was conducted in order to collect the rhino's horns and sell them on the black market. Rhinoceros horns are used in traditional Chinese medicine and Asian cultures, and a single horn can be sold for up to $300,000 on the black market.

On his death, Thierry Duguet, the head of the zoo, said "There has never been a case like this in a zoo in Europe, an assault of such violence, evidently for this stupid trafficking of rhinoceros horns". French Minister Ségolène Royal called the killing a "criminal act".

References

2012 animal births
2017 animal deaths
Individual rhinoceroses